Jetisu Region, sometimes spelled Zhetysu Region, is one of the Regions of Kazakhstan. Its administrative center is Taldykorgan. Total area of the region is 118,500 km².

Kazakh President Kassym-Jomart Tokayev announced on March 16, 2022 that the region would be created. The area split off from Almaty Region when Tokayev's decree came into force on June 8, 2022. The administrative center of the region is Taldykorgan, and the center of Almaty Region was moved to Qonayev. On June 11, 2022 Beibit Isabayev was appointed as akim of the region. The region's borders roughly correspond to the old Taldykorgan Region which was liquidated in 1997 and merged with Almaty Region.

References

Regions of Kazakhstan
2022 establishments in Kazakhstan
States and territories established in 2022